The Central District of Karaj County is in Alborz province, Iran. At the 2006 census, its population was 1,667,024, in 460,242 households, at which time the county was in Tehran province. The latest census in 2016 counted 1,956,267 people in 617,773 households.

References 

Karaj County

Districts of Alborz Province

Populated places in Alborz Province

Populated places in Karaj County